Dirty War is a single British television drama film, co-written by Lizzie Mickery and Daniel Percival and directed by Percival, that first broadcast on BBC One on 26 September 2004. The film, produced in association with HBO Films, follows a terrorist attack on Central London where a "dirty bomb" is deployed. Principal cast members for the film include Louise Delamere, Alastair Galbraith, William El-Gardi, Martin Savage, Koel Purie, Helen Schlesinger, Ewan Stewart and Paul Antony-Barber.

Following its broadcast in the UK, a live questions & answers session with the writers of the programme broadcast on BBC One at 22:50 GMT. In the United States, the film was made available on HBO on 24 January 2005, and the broadcast for the first time on PBS on 23 February 2005. The film was later released on DVD in the United States on October 6, 2005. Percival later won a BAFTA Award for Best New Director for his work on the film.

Production
Percival was tasked with creating the film by BBC executives, whose outline for the project was "think about what the new generation of terrorism actually meant". Percival stated that "The challenge of Dirty War was to tell the story of the attack from the intimate perspective of several different characters. We want to get the messages of this film to the widest possible audience."

Mickery was asked if she would like to co-write the script. She said of her contribution; "I think drama has the capacity to touch more people. If you are caught up in the emotions of the characters involved - and not just the statistics - the effect it has on you will last longer and be more intimate. Dirty War'''s aim is to try to make sense of the situation we all face, to ask questions on our behalf, and most importantly, to move us."

PlotDirty War opens with a quote from Eliza Manningham-Buller, the then-Director General of MI5: "It will only be a matter of time before a crude chemical, biological, or radiological (CBRN) attack is launched on a major Western city". When the bomb goes off in the heart of London, next to the entrance to Liverpool Street Underground station, the city's inadequate emergency services plans are put to an immediate test, with disturbing results for a population ill-prepared to understand or obey anti-contamination and quarantine orders.

In addition to touching upon the motivations of the Islamic extremist terrorists to conduct what they saw as a martyrdom operation, the events are shown through the eyes of three principal groups: the government, the emergency medical services, and the police. Nicola Painswick (Helen Schlesinger), Minister for London, and Deputy Assistant Commissioner John Ives (Ewan Stewart) of the Metropolitan Police Anti-Terrorist Branch, present a governmental point of view. Watch Commander Murray Corrigan (Alastair Galbraith) of the London Fire Brigade and his wife Liz Corrigan (Louise Delamere), who works for the National Health Service, present the emergency services' story. Detective Sergeant Mike Drummer (Martin Savage) and Detective Constable Sameena Habibullah (Koel Purie) lead the police investigation to catch the terrorists, under the watchful eye of their boss, Commander Paul Hardwick (Paul Antony-Barber). DC Habibullah, an English Muslim policewoman from Luton, who speaks Urdu, Punjabi, and Arabic, presents a unique point of view throughout the film.

Cast
 Louise Delamere as Liz Corrigan
 Alastair Galbraith as Murray Corrigan
 William El-Gardi as Abu Abassi 
 Martin Savage as DS Mike Drummer
 Koel Purie as DC Sameena Habibullah
 Helen Schlesinger as Nicola Painswick
 Ewan Stewart as DAC John Ives
 Paul Antony-Barber as Commander Paul Hardwick
 Louise Breckon-Richards as DC Vicky Loman
 Kameal Nisha Bisnauthsingh as Razla
 Shamshad Akhtar as Falzah
 Fuman Dar as Mohammed Ibn Harrara
 Houda Echouafni as Fatima
 George Georgiou as Usman Selcuk
 Dorian Healy as Harper
 David Horovitch as Lambert
 Amar Hussain as Imran Nazir
 Raza Jaffrey as Rashid Dhar
 Hosh Kane as Yousef Ghamidi
 Narinder Samra as Barber Asharf
 Jonty Stephens as DI Justin Lane
 Joe Tucker as DI Lance Brook
 Graeme Ford as DC Chris Scott
 Paul Maddaford as DC Richard Phillips

References

External links
 
 

2004 British television series debuts
2004 British television series endings
2000s British drama television series
2000s British mystery television series
BBC television dramas
English-language television shows
2004 television films
2004 films
BAFTA winners (films)
British television films
HBO Films films
Disaster television films
Films about nuclear war and weapons
Films about terrorism in Europe
Films about Islamic terrorism
Films set in London